Michał Kucharczyk (born 20 March 1991) is a Polish professional footballer who plays as a winger or a striker for Pogoń Szczecin in the Polish Ekstraklasa.

Club career
Kucharczyk was born in Warsaw. He began his career at Świt Nowy Dwór Mazowiecki and played in the III Liga (fourth tier) of Polish football for two seasons. In 2009, he was signed by Legia Warsaw and immediately loaned back to Świt to play in the Polish Second League (third tier). At the start of the 2010–11 season, he returned to Legia. He scored his first Ekstraklasa goal in a match against Lech Poznań on 24 September 2010.

On 22 July 2019, he signed with Russian Premier League club FC Ural Yekaterinburg.

International career
Kucharczyk debuted for the national team of Poland on 6 February 2011 in a friendly match against Moldova.

Career statistics

Club

1 Including Polish Super Cup.

International goals
Scores and results list Poland's goal tally first.

Honours

Club
Legia Warsaw
 Ekstraklasa: 2012–13, 2013–14, 2015–16, 2016–17, 2017–18
 Polish Cup: 2010–11, 2011–12, 2012–13, 2014–15, 2015–16, 2017–18

References

External links
 
 

1991 births
Living people
Polish footballers
Poland youth international footballers
Poland under-21 international footballers
Poland international footballers
Association football forwards
Świt Nowy Dwór Mazowiecki players
Legia Warsaw players
Legia Warsaw II players
FC Ural Yekaterinburg players
Pogoń Szczecin players
Ekstraklasa players
II liga players
III liga players
Russian Premier League players
Footballers from Warsaw
Polish expatriate footballers
Expatriate footballers in Russia
Polish expatriate sportspeople in Russia